Marie-Claire Baldenweg (born 27 March 1954) is a Swiss-Australian contemporary artist.

Life and work
Marie-Claire Baldenweg was born in Switzerland.

Since the early seventies almost all of her oil paintings feature the motif of a plastic shopping bag. Her style is a mix of photorealism and pop-art.

She lives in Byron Bay, is married to musician Pfuri Baldenweg and is the mother of three children.

Shows 
In 1988 the Powerhouse Museum (Hyde Park Barracks) hosted a 6 months solo exhibition called "Carried Away".
In 2003 the Swiss Stock Exchange hosted a museum-like solo exhibition of her work "Global Market – Bagflags of the World".
In 2005 the Australian Stock Exchange hosted a museum-like solo exhibition of her work "Global Market – Bagflags of the World".

Quotes 
The queen of plastic bag art, Marie-Claire Baldenweg. (Sunday Telegraph, Australia, 02/2005)
Marie-Claire could be thought of as working in a kind of latter-day Pop art style both celebrating the possibilities of globalisation while critiquing its unkinder aspects. (Anthony Bond, Director Curatorial and Head Curator International Art, Art Gallery of New South Wales)
For the Swiss artist Marie-Claire Baldenweg plastic carrier bags are "a typical symbol of our capitalistic high gloss- and hi-tech era." (ART Magazin, Germany, 11/2003)

References

External links 
 Official website

1954 births
Living people
20th-century Swiss painters
21st-century Swiss painters
20th-century Swiss women artists
21st-century Swiss women artists
Pop artists
Australian women painters
Australian people of Scandinavian descent
Photorealist artists
Swiss women painters
Swiss contemporary artists